Freshman studies is a required course at many liberal arts colleges in the United States. In general, it is mandatory for all freshman to take at least one or two terms.  Most programs seek to panoptically introduce students to a variety of material outside of their immediate interests, foster academic debate, and encourage students to become better writers.

The idea was created by Lawrence University President Nathan M. Pusey in 1945  and first implemented by Professor Waple, who chaired the Freshman Studies Committee at that school.

Lawrence University